AHDS Archaeology was one of the subject centres of the Arts and Humanities Data Service, which closed in March 2008, its role was to support digital research in the arts and humanities in the UK. AHDS Archaeology was hosted by the Archaeology Data Service at York University which continues to be funded directly by the Arts and Humanities Research Council.

Related links
Archaeology Data Service

External links
Archaeology Data Service

Archaeology of the United Kingdom
Education in the United Kingdom
Jisc
Defunct public bodies of the United Kingdom
Science and technology in the United Kingdom
University of York